Pamuklu can refer to:

 Pamuklu, Çermik
 Pamuklu, Karakoçan
 Pamuklu, Mut
 the Turkish name for Tavros, Cyprus